Grande Cache Community High School (GCCHS) is a public high school located in Grande Cache, Alberta, Canada.

In May of 2017 Grand Cache Community High School completed renovations intended to modernize the school. 

The school houses Grande Cache's public library.

References

External links
Official site
Old site

High schools in Alberta
Educational institutions established in 1969
1969 establishments in Alberta